Aston-by-Sutton is a civil parish in Cheshire West and Chester, England.  It is largely rural, with the West Coast Main Line and the Trent and Mersey Canal passing through its east border, and the River Weaver running to the south.  The parish contains 30 buildings that are recorded in the National Heritage List for England as designated listed buildings.  Of these, one is listed at Grade I, St Peter's Church, and the others at Grade II.  Of the latter, there are a number of tombs and other structures associated with the church.  The other listed buildings include houses, a war memorial, buildings associated with the former Aston Old Hall, and structures related to the canal.

Key

Buildings

See also
Listed buildings in Crowton
Listed buildings in Dutton
Listed buildings in Frodsham
Listed buildings in Kingsley
Listed buildings in Runcorn (rural area)
Listed buildings in Runcorn (urban area)
Listed buildings in Sutton

References
Citations

Sources

Listed buildings in Cheshire West and Chester
Lists of listed buildings in Cheshire